The Ajuran (Somali: Ajuuraan, Beesha Ajuuraan, Morshe, Arabic: أجران) is a Somali clan, part of the Jambelle clan which itself belongs to the largest Somali clan-family — the Hawiye. Ajuran members largely inhabit Kenya as well as southern east Ethiopia; considerable numbers are also found in southern Somalia. Some Ajuran members settled in Mogadishu.

Overview 
The Ajuran clan's origins are found in the Ajuran Sultanate, a Somali Muslim sultanate that ruled over large parts of the Horn of Africa in the Middle Ages. Today they largely live in Kenya, the North Eastern Province and the Somali region of Ethiopia, but also in Somalia. The Ajuran primarily speak the Somali language.

The Ajuran are said to be part of the Jambelle Hawiye but became displaced from modern Hawiye territories in the late 17th to early 18th centuries due to historical conflict particularly in South Central Somalia. Lee Cassanelli in his 1982 book "The Shaping of Somali Society: Reconstructing the History of a Pastoral People, 1600-1900" often refers to the Ajuran as former leaders of a Hawiye clan dynasty.

History 

Antiquity

Many traditions link the Ajuran with a people known to the Somalis as Madanle (Maantiiinle. Madinle, etc.) who were celebrated well-diggers in southern Somalia and northeastern Kenya.

Ajuran Empire

The Ajuran clan established the Garen Dynasty that ruled both Mogadishu Sultanate and Ajuran Sultanate during the Middle Ages.

Early Modern Period

During the early modern period, the Garen Dynasty survived the collapse of the Ajuran Sultanate and in the 19th century under Sultan Olol Dinle he established and revived the Ajuran Sultanate once again. He had carved a new sultanate out of the upper reaches of the Webi Shabelle, centered at Kelafo, the traditional capital at the turn of the 20th century.

Language 
The Ajuran in Somalia normally speak standard Somali while those in the riverside communities of Hirshabelle speak Maay Maay. For the Ajuran of Kenya, the linguistic case is more complex. The Wallemugge section are very often bilingual in Somali and Borana to an extent which makes it difficult to assess, without very elaborate investigation, which is their dominant language. However most sources state that Somali is the overwhelmingly dominant language in the North Eastern Province, so Borana knowledge is more numerous among Ajuran who live in Moyale where the language is prevalent.

Clan Tree 
This Clan Tree is based on "Identities on the Move: Clanship and Pastoralism in Northern Kenya" by Gunther Schlee.

-Samaale
Irir
Hawiye
Jambeelle
Harmaale
Balcad
Al'ama
Hintire
Wayteen
Quran Jecle
Sibir
Ajuuraan
 Wallemugge
Kunle
Gareen
Dayle
Cabdalle
Yarow
Arab
Seerjeele
Galiisle
Abgaal (maternal)
Dabuurow
Awrtable
Tukun
Geelbaariis
Mudina
Anjabreele
Garjeele
Moodin
Gedi²
Gasho¹
Dhulxada
Habar Carrare
Reer Yusuf
Riiba
Sanle
Faqa Shini
Saremugge
Tore
Daqsore
Baydan
Madale
Waaqle
Nuun
Uurmidig
Gidir
Beexaw
Daguro
Bayle
Kumatte
Madinle
Badbaydan
Hoydan

References

Sources
 
 

Somali clans